Agave parviflora is a species of succulent perennial flowering plant in the asparagus family, known by the common names Santa Cruz striped agave, smallflower century plant, and small-flower agave. It is native to Arizona in the United States and Sonora in Mexico.

The specific epithet parviflora means "small-flowered".

The leaf margins have peeling fibers. The plant produces an inflorescence tall with cream or pale yellow flowers in summer. The flowers are pollinated by bees such as bumblebees.

This species is the smallest agave in Arizona and is sought by collectors. For this reason the species has declined in its native habitat. There are only about two dozen natural populations in Arizona. Other threats to the species include road construction and mining. However, because the population appears to be stable and it grows in several protected areas, it is not considered by the IUCN to be threatened.

The plant is valued in cultivation and has gained the Royal Horticultural Society's Award of Garden Merit. 

Subspecies of the plant include ssp. parviflora and ssp. densiflora.

References

External links
USDA Plants Profile for Agave parviflora

parviflora
Flora of the Sonoran Deserts
Flora of Arizona
Flora of Sonora
Taxa named by John Torrey